Şevkati Hulusi Bey (born 1894, Kadıköy, Istanbul – died 1950, Istanbul) was a Turkish football player and one of the founders of Fenerbahçe Sports Club in 1907.

References

Clergy from Istanbul
Fenerbahçe S.K. footballers
1894 births
1950 deaths
Association footballers not categorized by position